Adrienne Marie  (born ) was an Australian female volleyball player, who played as a wing spiker. In 2003, she starting competing in beach volleyball.

She was part of the Australia women's national volleyball team at the 2002 FIVB Volleyball Women's World Championship in Germany.
On club level she played with University of Technology, Sydney.

Clubs
 University of Technology, Sydney (2002)

References

External links
 
 
 http://www.worldofvolley.com/wov-community/players/7265/adrienne-marie.html
 http://gbcbeach.com/traningar/boka-gbc-tranare/adrienne-marie

1972 births
Living people
Australian women's volleyball players
Place of birth missing (living people)
Wing spikers
University of Technology Sydney alumni